Águilas de Tamaulipas was a former Mexican football team that played in the Segunda División Profesional.  It was based in the city of Tamaulipas, Tamaulipas.

History

The club was founded in 2000 by Oscar Gutierrez who teach at that university bought the franchise from Club America that played in the Segunda División Profesional and moved the club to Tamaulipas.

The club won the 2000 Segunda División Profesional championship and was promoted to Primera A. In 2001 the club would change its name to Jaiba Brava de Tamaulipas and would reach the semifinales were the club fell to Atlético Cihuatlán.

Honors
 Segunda División Profesional (1):  2000

Defunct football clubs in Tamaulipas
Association football clubs established in 2000
2000 establishments in Mexico